Georgiy Chygayev (born October 19, 1983 in Lviv) is a Ukrainian amateur boxer in the flyweight division who qualified for the 2008 Olympics and won a gold medal at the 2008 European championships.

2007 World Amateur Boxing Championships 
At the 2007 World Amateur Boxing Championships in Chicago, Chygayev missed out on a bronze medal after he was defeated by France's Nordine Oubaali in the quarter finals. Chygayev qualified for the 2008 Summer Olympics, however, by virtue of getting to the quarter finals.

2008 Olympics 
At the Olympics he lost his second bout to Cuban Yampier Hernández.

2008 European Championships 
Chygayev went up to flyweight represented the Ukraine at the 2008 European Amateur Boxing Championships in Liverpool, England. At the championships Campbell defeated Munin Veli in the semifinals before facing lanky Swede Salomo N'tuve in the final.

Despite being much shorter than his opponent the Ukrainian cruised to a 5:0 victory.

References

External links 
 AIBA results for Olympic qualification at World Championships
 Georgiy Chygayev's profile at Yahoo! Sports
 

1983 births
Flyweight boxers
Living people
Olympic boxers of Ukraine
Boxers at the 2008 Summer Olympics
Ukrainian male boxers
Sportspeople from Lviv
21st-century Ukrainian people